English electronic music duo AlunaGeorge have released two studio albums, one extended play, twenty-nine singles (including 10 as a featured artist) and sixteen music videos.

Albums

Studio albums

Remix album

Extended plays

Singles

As lead artist

As featured artist

Remixes

Guest appearances

Production discography

Music videos

References
Notes

Citations

Discographies of British artists